Scuderia Veloce was an Australian motor racing team founded by journalist racer David McKay and his chief mechanic Bob Atkin. The team, which competed in many motor racing categories in the 1960s, is regarded as the first professional motor racing operation in Australia. It was based in Wahroonga on Sydney's upper North Shore. It later became a motor car dealership Specialising in Volvo, Porsche and Ferrari with Bob Atkin as the Managing Director. 

McKay gained prominence as a racing driver and as a motoring writer during the 1950s. He won many races including the inaugural Australian Touring Car Championship in 1960 driving a Jaguar Mark 1.

McKay's operation began sporting the Scuderia Veloce name in 1960, following a change of sponsorship from Ampol to Castrol. It ran Cooper-Climax, then Brabham-Climax open racings cars in the Tasman Series, Australian Grand Prix and Australian Drivers' Championship. In 1969 the team was Ferrari's official Tasman Series team and had Chris Amon and Derek Bell in the drivers seats. The venture was a success with Amon winning the 1969 Tasman Series, which included winning the Australian Grand Prix at Lakeside and New Zealand Grand Prix at Pukekohe.

Scuderia Veloce also competed in Appendix J Touring Cars running a variety of cars, as well as competing in Sports Car racing with Ferraris. A Scuderia Veloce entered Ferrari 250 LM won the 1965 Six Hour Le Mans, the 1966 Rothmans 12 Hour International Sports Car Race, the 1967 Rothmans 12 Hour and the 1968 Surfers Paradise 6 Hour.

As well as his own racing efforts, McKay supported several drivers including Brian Muir and Greg Cusack, although the driver most associated with SV would be Spencer Martin.

Tasman Series results

References

Australian auto racing teams
Sports teams in Sydney